Sami Larabi (born 13 April 1996) is a French footballer who currently plays for the reserves of Ligue 1 side Toulouse FC. He plays as a center back.

Club career 
Larabi is a youth exponent from Toulouse. He made his Ligue 1 debut on 17 January 2014 against SC Bastia replacing Jean-Armel Kana-Biyik after 87 minutes in a 1–1 home draw.

References

1996 births
Living people
Association football defenders
French footballers
Ligue 1 players
Toulouse FC players
Footballers from Toulouse